www.thug.com is the second studio album by American rapper Trick Daddy, known at the time under the name as Trick Daddy Dollars and released after his debut album Based on a True Story. The album was released on September 22, 1998, through Slip-N-Slide/Warlock Records. The album managed to peak at number 30 on the Billboard 200, the fifth-highest peak of any Trick Daddy album. In 1999, the album was certified Gold by the Recording Industry Association of America. The title www.thug.com was also the URL of Trick Daddy's official website.

Track listing

Charts

Weekly charts

Year-end charts

Certifications

References

External links

1998 albums
Trick Daddy albums
Warlock Records albums